Lokosphinx is a Russian UCI Continental cycling team established in 2012.

After the 2022 Russian invasion of Ukraine, the UCI announced that Russian teams were forbidden from competing in international events.

Team roster

Major wins

2012
 Overall Volta ao Alentejo, Alexey Kunshin
Stage 2, Alexey Kunshin
Stage 3, Sergey Shilov
Vuelta a La Rioja, Evgeny Shalunov
Stage 2 Troféu Joaquim Agostinho, Sergey Belykh
Stage 2 Vuelta Ciclista a León, Sergey Belykh
2013
Stage 3 Vuelta Ciclista a León, Sergey Shilov
2014
Gran Premio della Liberazione, Evgeny Shalunov
Stage 2 Troféu Joaquim Agostinho, Kirill Sveshnikov
Stage 8 Volta a Portugal, Sergey Shilov
2015
Stage 2 Vuelta a Castilla y León, Sergey Shilov
 Overall Vuelta a la Comunidad de Madrid, Evgeny Shalunov
Stage 1, Evgeny Shalunov
Prologue Troféu Joaquim Agostinho, Sergey Shilov
Trofeo Matteotti, Evgeny Shalunov
2017
Stage 1 Vuelta a Castilla y León, Alexander Evtushenko
Stage 4 Flèche du Sud, Mamyr Stash
Stage 1 GP Beiras e Serra da Estrela, Alexander Evtushenko
Trofeo Matteotti, Sergey Shilov
Prueba Villafranca de Ordizia, Sergey Shilov
2018
Clássica da Arrábida, Dmitry Strakhov
Stages 2 & 3 Volta ao Alentejo, Dmitry Strakhov
Overall GP Beiras e Serra da Estrela, Dmitry Strakhov
Stage 1, Dmitry Strakhov
Stage 1 Vuelta a Asturias, Dmitry Strakhov
2019
Stage 4 Tour of Romania, Savva Novikov
Overall Tour of Azerbaijan (Iran), Savva Novikov
Stage 1, Aleksandr Smirnov
Stage 3, Savva Novikov

References

External links

UCI Continental Teams (Europe)
Cycling teams established in 2012
Cycling teams based in Russia
2012 establishments in Russia